Aurora Glacier is a  long glacier in the U.S. state of Alaska.

The glacier is the namesake for the Alaska Marine Highway vessel M/V Aurora.

See also
 List of glaciers in the United States

References

Glaciers of Glacier Bay National Park and Preserve
Glaciers of Hoonah–Angoon Census Area, Alaska
Glaciers of Unorganized Borough, Alaska